The Tiger That Isn't: Seeing Through a World of Numbers is a statistics book written by Michael Blastland and Andrew Dilnot, the creator and presenter of BBC Radio 4's More or Less.  Like the radio show, it addresses the misuse of statistics in politics and the media.

The book has received favourable reviews for the simple presentation of complicated ideas.

Notes

References
Blastland, Michael; and  Dilnot, (2007) The Tiger That Isn't: Seeing Through a World of Numbers, Profile Books. 

2007 non-fiction books
Statistics books